Euchelus is a genus of sea snails, marine gastropod mollusks in the family Chilodontaidae (formerly in the family Trochidae).

Description
The umbilicate or imperforate shell has a globose-turbinate shape. It is umbilicate or imperforate. The whorls are rounded and with spirally granose revolving ribs. The aperture is subcircular. The outer lip is thickened, and crenulate within. The columella shows  a central tooth or a notch at the base. The operculum has few whorls that are rapidly increasing.

Distribution
This marine species occur in the Indo-Pacific.

Species
Species within the genus Euchelus include:
 Euchelus alarconi Rehder, 1980
 Euchelus asper (Gmelin, 1791)
 Euchelus atratus (Gmelin, 1791)
 Euchelus barbadensis Dall, 1927
 Euchelus bermudensis Moolenbeek & Faber, 1989
 Euchelus bitoi Nomura & Hatai, 1940
 Euchelus circulatus (Anton, 1849)
 Euchelus dampierensis Jansen, 1994
 Euchelus decora Poppe & Tagaro, 2016
 Euchelus eucastus Dall, 1927
 Euchelus guttarosea Dall, 1889
 Euchelus horridus (Philippi, 1846)
 Euchelus hummelincki Moolenbeek & Faber, 1989
 Euchelus mysticus Pilsbry, 1889
 Euchelus oxytropis (Philippi, 1848)
 Euchelus persicus (E. von Martens, 1874)
 Euchelus polysarkon Vilvens, 2017
 Euchelus pullatus Anton, 1848
 Euchelus scaber (Linnaeus, 1758)
Taxon inquirendum
 Euchelus maculosus Pease, 1863 
 Species brought into synonymy
 Euchelus (Herpetopoma) Pilsbry, 1890; synonym of Herpetopoma Pilsbry, 1890
 Euchelus (Nevillia) H. Adams, 1868; synonym of Nevillia H. Adams, 1868
 Euchelus alabastrum (Reeve, 1858); synonym of Euchelus asper (Gmelin, 1791)
 Euchelus alarconi Rehder, 1980: synonym of Herpetopoma alarconi (Rehder, 1980)
 Euchelus ampullus Tate, 1893; synonym of Vaceuchelus ampullus (Tate, 1893)
 Euchelus angulatus Pease, 1867; synonym of Vaceuchelus angulatus (Pease, 1867)
 Euchelus bellus Hutton, 1873; synonym of Herpetopoma bellum (Hutton, 1873)
 Euchelus bicinctus Philippi, 1849: synonym of Clanculus tonnerrei (G. Nevill & H. Nevill, 1874)
 Euchelus bourcierei Crosse, 1863: synonym of Herpetopoma instrictum (Gould, 1849)
 Euchelus bronni Dunker, 1860: synonym of Clanculus bronni Dunker, 1860 
 Euchelus corrugatus Pease, 1861: synonym of Herpetopoma corrugatum (Pease, 1861)
 Euchelus erythraeensis Sturany, 1903; synonym of Clanculus tonnerrei (G. Nevill & H. Nevill, 1874)
 Euchelus favosus Melvill & Standen, 1896; synonym of Vaceuchelus clathratus (A. Adams, 1853)
  Euchelus fischeri (Montrouzier in Souverbie & Montrouzier, 1866): synonym of Monodonta fischeri Montrouzier [in Souverbie & Montrouzier], 1866; synonym of Herpetopoma fischeri (Montrouzier [in Souverbie & Montrouzier], 1866); synonym of Herpetopoma exasperatum (A. Adams, 1853)
  Euchelus gemmula Turton, 1932; synonym of Vaceuchelus gemmula (Turton, 1932)
 Euchelus gemmatus (Gould, 1845): synonym of Herpetopoma gemmatum (Gould, 1845)
 Euchelus hachijoensis Pilsbry, 1904: synonym of Herpetopoma rubrum (A. Adams, 1851)
 Euchelus lamberti (Souverbie in Souverbie & Montrouzier, 1875): synonym of Tallorbis roseola G. Nevill & H. Nevill, 1869
 Euchelus lischkei Pilsbry, 1904: synonym of Herpetopoma lischkei (Pilsbry, 1904)
 Euchelus midwayensis Habe & Kosuge, 1970: synonym of Danilia eucheliformis (Nomura & Hatai, 1940)
 Euchelus natalensis E. A. Smith, 1906; synonym of Vaceuchelus natalensis (E. A. Smith, 1906)
 Euchelus profundior May, 1915; synonym of Vaceuchelus profundior (May, 1915)
 Euchelus providentiae Melvill, 1909: synonym of Herpetopoma providentiae (Melvill, 1909)
 Euchelus quadricarinatus (Holten, 1802): synonym of Euchelus asper (Gmelin, 1791)
 Euchelus ringens Schepman, 1908; synonym of Herpetopoma ringens (Schepman, 1908)
 Euchelus ruber: synonym of Herpetopoma rubrum (A. Adams, 1853)
 Euchelus scabriusculus A. Adams & Angas, 1867; synonym of Herpetopoma scabriusculum (A. Adams & Angas, 1867)
 Euchelus scrobiculatus (Souverbie, 1886); synonym of Vaceuchelus scrobiculatus (Souverbie, 1866)
 Euchelus seychellarum G. Nevill & H. Nevill, 1869; synonym of Herpetopoma seychellarum (G. Nevill & H. Nevill, 1869)
 Euchelus smithi Dunker, R.W., 1882: synonym of Monilea smithi (Wood, 1828) 
 Euchelus townsendianus Melvill & Standen, 1903; synonym of Clypeostoma townsendianum (Melvill & Standen, 1903)
 Euchelus xeniolum Melvill, 1918; synonym of Herpetopoma xeniolum (Melvill, 1918)

References

 Vaught, K.C. (1989). A classification of the living Mollusca. American Malacologists: Melbourne, FL (USA). . XII, 195 pp
  Herbert D.G. (2012) A revision of the Chilodontidae (Gastropoda: Vetigastropoda: Seguenzioidea) of southern Africa and the south-western Indian Ocean. African Invertebrates, 53(2): 381–502

 
Chilodontaidae
Gastropod genera